Dmitri Vladimirovich Dragun (born 25 March 1994) is a Russian ice dancer. With partner Maria Simonova, he is the 2012 Youth Olympics bronze medalist.

Programs 
(with Simonova)

Competitive highlights 
(with Dragun)

References

External links 
 

Russian male ice dancers
1994 births
Living people
Sportspeople from Samara, Russia
Figure skaters at the 2012 Winter Youth Olympics
20th-century Russian people
21st-century Russian people